Dzurinda's Second Cabinet was the government of Slovakia between 16 October 2002 and 4 July 2006 headed by the prime minister Mikuláš Dzurinda, for whom it was the second consecutive term in this office.

Government ministers

Deputy Prime Ministers

External links
 Official Website of the Slovak Government

Government of Slovakia
Cabinets established in 2002
2002 establishments in Slovakia
2006 disestablishments in Slovakia
Cabinets disestablished in 2006
Slovak government cabinets
Christian Democratic Movement
Slovak Democratic and Christian Union – Democratic Party